Chvorinov's rule is an applied physics relationship first expressed by Czech engineer Nicolas Chvorinov in 1940, that relates the solidification time for a simple casting to the volume and surface area of the casting.

Rule 
In simple terms the rule establishes that under otherwise identical conditions, the casting with large surface area and small volume will cool more rapidly than a casting with small surface area and a large volume. The relationship can be written as:

The ratio of the casting's volume to its surface area is the modulus :

The mold constant  depends on the properties of the metal, such as density, heat capacity, heat of fusion and superheat, and the mold, such as initial temperature, density, thermal conductivity, heat capacity and wall thickness.

Mold Constant (B) 
According to Askeland, the constant  is usually 2, however Degarmo claims it is between 1.5 and 2. The mold constant of Chvorinov's rule, can be calculated using the following formula:

where

 = melting or freezing temperature of the liquid (in kelvins),
 = initial temperature of the mold (in kelvins),
 = superheat (in kelvins),
 = latent heat of fusion (in ),
 = thermal conductivity of the mold (in ),
 = density of the mold (in ),
 = specific heat of the mold (in ),
 = density of the metal (in ),
 = specific heat of the metal (in ).

It is most useful in determining if a riser will solidify before the casting, because if the riser solidifies first then defects like shrinkage or porosity can form.

References

Casting (manufacturing)
Metallurgy